Sithembiso Mfundo Siphesihle 'Sti' Sithole (born 31 March 1993 in Durban, South Africa) is a South African rugby union player for the  in Super Rugby, the  in the Currie Cup and the  in the Rugby Challenge. His regular position is loosehead prop.

Career

Youth and Varsity rugby

As a scholar at Westville Boys' High School, Sithole was included in the KwaZulu-Natal squad at the Under-16 Grant Khomo Week in 2009.

He then moved to Cape Town to join . He played for the  side during the 2012 Under-19 Provincial Championship (making thirteen appearances as he helped the team win the competition) and for the  side during the 2013 Under-21 Provincial Championship (once again helping him team win the tournament).

He also played for the  during the 2013 Varsity Cup competition.

2013 IRB Junior World Championship

In 2013, Sithole was a member of the South African Under-20 side that competed at the 2013 IRB Junior World Championship in France. After substitute appearances in their pool stage matches against the United States and England, he started in their final pool stage match against hosts France. He was an unused substitute as South Africa got eliminated from the competition in the Semi-finals against Wales, but was restored to their third place play-off match against New Zealand, helping South Africa to a third-place finish in the tournament.

Western Province / Stormers

His first senior start in domestic rugby came during the 2014 Vodacom Cup competition in April 2014. He came on as a substitute against Kenyan invitational side , with the South African side winning 65–29.

References

South African rugby union players
Living people
1993 births
Rugby union players from Durban
Rugby union props
Stormers players
Western Province (rugby union) players
South Africa Under-20 international rugby union players
Southern Kings players
Lions (United Rugby Championship) players
Golden Lions players